6 Serpentis is a binary star system in the constellation Serpens. It has a combined apparent visual magnitude of 5.382, which is bright enough to be faintly visible to the naked eye. It is moving further from the Sun with a heliocentric radial velocity of +10 km/s.

The primary, component A, is an evolved red giant of spectral type K3III, a star that has used up its core hydrogen and has expanded. At the age of around six billion years it is a red clump star, indicating it is on the horizontal branch and is generating energy through helium fusion at its core. The star has 1.27 times the mass of the Sun and has expanded to 12 times the Sun's radius. It is radiating 55 times the Sun's luminosity from its enlarged photosphere at an effective temperature of 4,417 K.

References

K-type giants
Horizontal-branch stars
Binary stars
Serpens (constellation)
Durchmusterung objects
Serpentis, 06
136514
075119
5710